Chen Youben  (陳有本; 1780–1858) was a 14th generation descendant and 6th generation master of the famed Chen Family and considered to be an influential martial artist and teacher of Chen-style taijiquan (t'ai chi ch’uan).

Chen Youben was the main teacher of Chen Qingping (1795-1868) and taught Chen Youlun, Chen Fengzhang, Chen Sande, Chen Tingdong, and his late, older brother’s sons, Chen Zhongshen (1809-1891) and Chen Jishen (b. 1809). He also helped prepare Chen Gengyun to have sufficient martial skills to travel with Chen Changxing’s, his father's, caravan escort service.

Chen Youben is credited by some with the creation of what Chen Ziming (1932) called the “xinjia” (new frame) as opposed to the “laojia" (old frame) referring to the traditional, seven-form system of Chen Wanting. This "new frame" is now equated with the “Xiaojia" (small frame) within the modern Chen Family routines.

Additionally, a taijiquan evolution theory points to Chen Gengyun who learned enlarged movements and emphasized explosive power (Bao Fa Li) in order to be prepared to accompany Chen Changxing's caravan escort service. If the theory is correct, as Gengyun's teacher, Chen Youben was also the creator of the “Dajia" (Large Frame) within the modern Chen Family routines.

T'ai chi ch'uan lineage tree with Chen-style focus

Chen Youben (1780-1858)

References

External links
 Chenstyle.com

Chinese tai chi practitioners
Sportspeople from Henan
People from Jiaozuo
1780 births
1858 deaths